José Ignacio Fernández Palacios (born 3 February 1967), known as Nacho, is a Spanish retired footballer who played as a left-back.

His entire professional career was associated to Celta and Compostela. He appeared in 198 La Liga matches over eight seasons, scoring four goals.

Club career
Born in Foz, Province of Lugo, Nacho spent his entire career in his native Galicia. He signed in 1986 with RC Celta de Vigo from amateurs Gran Peña FC, making his first-team debut in the Segunda División and contributing 20 games (15 starts) as the club promoted to La Liga.

Nacho played his first match in the top flight on 6 September 1987, featuring ten minutes in a 3–3 home draw against Valencia CF and finishing the season with 18 appearances in an eventual seventh-place finish. He continued to be regularly used the following years, being relegated in 1990 but winning promotion in 1992, even though he was only a fringe player in the latter campaign.

In the summer of 1992, Nacho joined SD Compostela of the second tier, playing 20 games in his second year in a first-ever promotion to the top division. From 1995 to 1998 he made an average of 35 league appearances, with the team being relegated at the end of 1997–98.

Nacho spent three more seasons with Compostela, totalling only 23 matches and suffering relegation in 2001, although he made no appearances in his last year. He retired in June 2001, at the age of 34.

International career
In 1995, Spain manager Javier Clemente thought of Nacho as Sergi Barjuán's backup for the UEFA Euro 1996 tournament, and told the media that he would be called-up for the national team's next game. In an interview to El País, the player stated he had no desire to be selected, saying he did not "relate" to the cause. Since such an action was punishable with a one-year ban, the manager decided not to pick him after phoning him to make sure of his position, and his place would be eventually occupied by former Celta teammate and fellow Galician Jorge Otero.

Nacho finally represented Galicia in 2005, appearing against Uruguay at the  Estadio Multiusos de San Lázaro.

References

External links

Celta de Vigo biography 

1967 births
Living people
People from A Mariña Central
Sportspeople from the Province of Lugo
Spanish footballers
Footballers from Galicia (Spain)
Association football defenders
La Liga players
Segunda División players
RC Celta de Vigo players
SD Compostela footballers
Spanish football managers
Tercera División managers